Jay Haas (born July 30, 1990) is an American mixed martial artist currently competing in the Featherweight division.

Mixed martial arts record

|-
| Loss
| align=center| 15-17 (1)
| Scott Heckman
| Submission (brabo choke)
| Maverick MMA 5: Heckman vs. Haas 3
| 
| align=center| 2
| align=center| 0:59
| Allentown, Pennsylvania, United States
| 
|-
| Loss
| align=center| 15-16 (1)
| Scott Heckman
| Submission (north-south choke)
| Cage Fury FC 52: Horcher vs. Regman
| 
| align=center| 2
| align=center| 1:17
| Atlantic City, New Jersey, United States
|Catchweight (141 lbs) bout.
|-
| Win
| align=center| 15-15 (1)
| Ran Weathers
| Decision (split)
| Camp Lejeune: For the Leathernecks 4
| 
| align=center| 3
| align=center| 4:00
| Jacksonville, North Carolina, United States
| 
|-
| Loss
| align=center| 14-15 (1)
| Brian Kelleher
| Submission (guillotine choke)
| Cage Fury FC 49: Honor vs. Oliveira
| 
| align=center| 1
| align=center| 4:49
| Bethlehem, Pennsylvania, United States
|Catchweight (141 lbs) bout.
|-
| Win
| align=center| 14-14 (1)
| Scott Heckman
| Submission (triangle choke)
| Cage Fury FC 47: Webb vs. Harshbarger
| 
| align=center| 1
| align=center| 1:15
| Bethlehem, Pennsylvania, United States
|Catchweight (140 lbs) bout.
|-
| Win
| align=center| 13-14 (1)
| Stacey Anderson
| Submission (rear-naked choke)
| Shogun Fights 11
| 
| align=center| 1
| align=center| 1:51
| Baltimore, Maryland, United States
|Catchweight (143 lbs) bout.
|-
| Win
| align=center| 12-14 (1)
| Evan Chmielski
| TKO (punches)
| Cage Fury FC 37: Anyanwu vs. Bell
| 
| align=center| 1
| align=center| 3:13
| Philadelphia, Pennsylvania, United States
|Catchweight (140 lbs) bout.
|-
| Loss
| align=center| 11-14 (1)
| Lester Caslow
| Submission (guillotine choke)
| Bellator 118
| 
| align=center| 1
| align=center| 2:29
| Atlantic City, New Jersey, United States
| 
|-
| Loss
| align=center| 11-13 (1)
| Lester Caslow
| Submission (guillotine choke)
| Bellator CIX
| 
| align=center| 3
| align=center| 2:44
| Bethlehem, Pennsylvania, United States
| 
|-
| Loss
| align=center| 11-12 (1)
| Ahsan Abdullah
| TKO (punches)
| Xtreme Caged Combat: Adrenaline
| 
| align=center| 1
| align=center| 1:38
| Wilkes-Barre, Pennsylvania, United States
| 
|-
| Win
| align=center| 11-11 (1)
| Eddie Fyvie
| TKO (punches)
| Cage Fury FC 24: Sullivan vs. Becker
| 
| align=center| 1
| align=center| 0:46
| Atlantic City, New Jersey, United States
| 
|-
| Loss
| align=center| 10-11 (1)
| Brylan Van Artsdalen
| Submission (guillotine choke)
| Bellator LXXIV
| 
| align=center| 1
| align=center| 1:03
| Atlantic City, New Jersey, United States
| 
|-
| Loss
| align=center| 10-10 (1)
| Mike Bannon
| Submission (kneebar)
| PA Cage Fight 12
| 
| align=center| 1
| align=center| 1:47
| Olyphant, Pennsylvania, United States
| 
|-
| Loss
| align=center| 10-9 (1)
| Kenny Foster
| Submission (guillotine choke)
| Bellator LXV
| 
| align=center| 1
| align=center| 2:51
| Atlantic City, New Jersey, United States
| 
|-
| Loss
| align=center| 10-8 (1)
| Anthony Morrison
| Submission (guillotine choke)
| Cage Fury FC 13: Gambino vs. Foster
| 
| align=center| 1
| align=center| 3:37
| Atlantic City, New Jersey, United States
| 
|-
| Loss
| align=center| 10-7 (1)
| Neil Johnson
| Submission (rear-naked choke)
| Pennsylvania FC 6
| 
| align=center| 1
| align=center| 3:19
| Harrisburg, Pennsylvania, United States
| 
|-
| Win
| align=center| 10-6 (1)
| Nick Bleser
| TKO (elbows)
| Martial Arts Super Sport: Inauguration
| 
| align=center| 1
| align=center| 3:25
| Wilkes-Barre, Pennsylvania, United States
|Catchweight (151 lbs) bout.
|-
| Win
| align=center| 9-6 (1)
| Steve McCabe
| Submission (armbar)
| American MMA Fight League 2: Fight Night
| 
| align=center| 1
| align=center| 0:49
| Newtown, Pennsylvania, United States
| 
|-
| Loss
| align=center| 8-6 (1)
| James Jones
| Submission (rear-naked choke)
| Shogun Fights 4
| 
| align=center| 1
| align=center| 3:30
| Baltimore, Maryland, United States
| 
|-
| Win
| align=center| 8-5 (1)
| Michael Phillips
| Decision (unanimous)
| Pennsylvania FC 5
| 
| align=center| 3
| align=center| 5:00
| Harrisburg, Pennsylvania, United States
| 
|-
| Win
| align=center| 7-5 (1)
| Steve Franklin
| Submission (armbar)
| Valley Fight League 29: Mason Dixon Showdown 5
| 
| align=center| 1
| align=center| 0:42
| Chambersburg, Pennsylvania, United States
| 
|-
| Win
| align=center| 6-5 (1)
| Noe Quintanilla
| Submission (rear-naked choke)
| Central Pennsylvania Warrior Challenge 9
| 
| align=center| 1
| align=center| 4:16
| York, Pennsylvania, United States
| 
|-
| Win
| align=center| 5-5 (1)
| Noe Quintanilla
| Submission (rear-naked choke)
| PA FC 3
| 
| align=center| 1
| align=center| 2:55
| Harrisburg, Pennsylvania, United States
| 
|-
| Win
| align=center| 4-5 (1)
| Timothy Wade
| TKO (punches)
| Central Pennsylvania Warrior Challenge 5
| 
| align=center| 2
| align=center| 0:51
| York, Pennsylvania, United States
| 
|-
| Loss
| align=center| 3-5 (1)
| Noe Quintanilla
| Submission (rear-naked choke)
| Northeast MMA: Cage Fight 3
| 
| align=center| 1
| align=center| 3:13
| Wilkes-Barre, Pennsylvania, United States
| 
|-
| Loss
| align=center| 3-4 (1)
| Jim Hettes
| Submission (heel hook)
| Northeast MMA: Cage Fight 2
| 
| align=center| 1
| align=center| 0:47
| Scranton, Pennsylvania, United States
| 
|-
| Win
| align=center| 3-3 (1)
| Michael Bunyamanop
| TKO (punches)
| PA FC 1
| 
| align=center| 1
| align=center| 1:56
| Harrisburg, Pennsylvania, United States
| 
|-
| Loss
| align=center| 2-3 (1)
| Sean Santella
| Submission (kneebar)
| Central Pennsylvania Warrior Challenge 3
| 
| align=center| 1
| align=center| 2:51
| Lancaster, Pennsylvania, United States
| 
|-
| Loss
| align=center| 2-2 (1)
| Doug Anderson
| Submission (guillotine choke)
| The Arena Assault
| 
| align=center| 2
| align=center| 4:09
| Philadelphia, Pennsylvania, United States
| 
|-
| NC
| align=center| 2-1 (1)
| Preston Marks
| No Contest
| Central Pennsylvania Warrior Challenge 2
| 
| align=center| 1
| align=center| 4:20
| York, Pennsylvania, United States
| 
|-
| Win
| align=center| 2-1
| Doug Sonier
| Submission (armbar)
| World Karate Union: Warrior Challenge in the Poconos
| 
| align=center| 1
| align=center| 1:22
| Pocono Manor, Pennsylvania, United States
| 
|-
| Loss
| align=center| 1-1
| Will Childs
| Submission (kneebar)
| Central Pennsylvania Warrior Challenge 1
| 
| align=center| 1
| align=center| 3:53
| York, Pennsylvania, United States
| 
|-
| Win
| align=center| 1-0
| Bao Khong
| TKO (punches)
| Gladiator Fight Club 4
| 
| align=center| 2
| align=center| 1:40
| Winchester, Virginia, United States
|

See also
List of male mixed martial artists

References

1990 births
American male mixed martial artists
Bantamweight mixed martial artists
Featherweight mixed martial artists
Lightweight mixed martial artists
Living people